"Baby Boy" is a single released in 2003 by British hip hop-R&B group Big Brovaz. The single is the fourth single taken from Big Brovaz' 2002 debut album, Nu-Flow. "Baby Boy" became Big Brovaz' fourth UK top-10 hit, peaking at number four and spending three months on the UK Singles Chart. The song was also their third top-10 hit on the Australian Singles Chart, peaking at number eight and receiving a platinum certification from the Australian Recording Industry Association. "Baby Boy" additionally reached number 10 in Ireland, number 13 in New Zealand, and number 29 in Flanders.

The video for the song parodies the popular sitcom Friends and was directed by Vaughan Arnell. "Baby Boy" was released across two CD singles and featured two previously unreleased tracks, "Anything" and "Party Over Here".

Track listings

UK CD1
 "Baby Boy" (radio edit) – 3:18
 "Baby Boy" (Blacksmith remix) – 4:17
 "Anything" – 3:40
 "Baby Boy" (video version)

UK CD2
 "Baby Boy" (radio edit) – 3:18
 "Party Over Here" – 3:35
 "Baby Boy" (Jaimeson vocal mix) – 5:45

European CD single
 "Baby Boy" (radio edit) – 3:18
 "Baby Boy" (Blacksmith remix) – 4:17

Australian maxi-single
 "Baby Boy" (radio edit)
 "Baby Boy" (Blacksmith remix)
 "Baby Boy" (Kardinal beats L.A. remix)
 "Party Over Here"

Credits and personnel
Credits are lifted from the UK CD1 liner notes.

Studio
 Recorded at Dairy Studios (Brixton, England)

Personnel

 Michael Mugisha – writing
 John Paul Horsley – writing
 Michael Brown – writing
 Cherise Roberts – writing
 Nadia Shepherd – writing
 Dion Howell – writing

 Abdul Bello – writing
 Temi Tayo Aisida – writing
 Big Brovaz – vocals
 Stuart Reid – acoustic guitar, bass guitar, electric guitar, engineering, mixing
 Skillz and Fingaz – production
 Richard Morris – engineering assistant

Charts

Weekly charts

Year-end charts

Certifications

Release history

References

2002 songs
2003 singles
Big Brovaz songs
Daylight Records singles
Epic Records singles
Music videos directed by Vaughan Arnell